Joseph F. Scott (April 22, 1916 – May 25, 1971) was an American professional basketball player. He played for the Cleveland Allmen Transfers in the National Basketball League during the 1945–46 season and averaged 2.5 points per game.

Scott was also a standout track athlete. He won the United States Decathlon Championship (a 10-event test to determine the best athlete in the country) in New York City in 1938, and successfully defended his title a year later in Cleveland, Ohio.

References

1916 births
1971 deaths
United States Army personnel of World War II
American male decathletes
American men's basketball players
Basketball players from Ohio
Case Western Spartans men's basketball players
Centers (basketball)
Cleveland Allmen Transfers players
Forwards (basketball)
People from Elyria, Ohio